The 2014 Leinster Senior Hurling Championship Final, the deciding game of the 2014 Leinster Senior Hurling Championship, was a hurling match played on 6 July 2014 at Croke Park, Dublin, contested by Dublin and Kilkenny. 

Kilkenny, captained by Lester Ryan won their 69th Leinster hurling title with a dominant display in a 0-24 to 1-9 win over defending champions Dublin. TJ Reid scored 10 points for Kilkenny, eight from placed balls.	
Kilkenny had a 0-13 to 1-6 lead at half-time. Henry Shefflin equalled Michael Kavanagh’s record with his 13th Leinster title winning medal.

Match Details

References

Leinster
Leinster Senior Hurling Championship Finals
Kilkenny GAA matches
Dublin GAA matches